

Ancient Times

Nubia
circa 3,050 B.C.E. Hor-Aha, the second pharaoh of Egypt, led a campaign against the Nubians

Kingdom of Kerma
circa 1,506 B.C.E. — 1,493 B.C.E. During the reign of Thutmose I, the Kingdom of Kerma rebelled against Egyptian rule and Thutmose I traveled up the Nile and fought in the battle, personally killing the Nubian king

Egyptian Empire

circa 1,282 B.C.E. Seti's military campaigns
circa 1,279 B.C.E. — 1,213 B.C.E. Ramesses II's campaigns in Nubia

Kingdom of Kush
23 B.C.E. The Roman prefect of Egypt invaded the Kingdom of Kush after an initial attack by the queen of Meröe, razing Napata to the ground
circa 300 C.E. Ezana of Axum launched several military campaigns, destroying the Kingdom of Kush

Medieval Times

Kingdom of Makuria
1,312 C.E. Mamluk invasion

Modern Times

Sultanate of Darfur
1,722 C.E. — 1,786 C.E. Civil War

Egypt Eyalet

February 1,820 C.E. — October 1,822 C.E. Invasion of Libya and Sudan

Khedivate of Egypt

1899 — 1901 Rabih War
1874 Rabih az-Zubayr conquered the Sultanate of Darfur
1881 C.E. — 1899 C.E. The Mahdist War
November 3, 1883 C.E. — November 5, 1883 C.E. Battle of El Obeid
February 4, 1884 C.E. — February 29, 1884 C.E. First and Second Battles of El Teb
March 13, 1884 C.E. Battle of Tamai
March 13, 1884 C.E. — January 26, 1885 C.E. Siege of Khartoum
January 17, 1885 C.E. Battle of Abu Klea
March 22, 1885 C.E. Battle of Tofrek
February 10, 1885 C.E. Battle of Kirbekan
December 30, 1885 C.E. Battle of Ginnis
December 20, 1888 C.E. Battle of Suakin
March 9, 1889 C.E. — March 10, 1889 C.E. Battle of Gallabat
July 17, 1894 C.E. Battle of Kassala
June 7, 1896 C.E. Battle of Ferkeh
April 8, 1898 C.E. Battle of Atbara
September 2, 1898 C.E. Battle of Omdurman
November 25, 1899 C.E. Battle of Umm Diwaykarat

Anglo-Egyptian Sudan
July 28, 1914 C.E. — November 11, 1918 C.E. World War I
October 29, 1914 C.E. — October 30, 1918 C.E. Middle Eastern theatre
1,914 C.E. — 1918 C.E. North African theatre
November 19, 1915 C.E. — February 1917 C.E. Senussi Campaign
September 1, 1939 C.E. — September 2, 1945 C.E. World War II
June 10, 1940 C.E. — May 2, 1945 C.E. Mediterranean and Middle East theatre
June 10, 1940 C.E. — November 27, 1941 C.E. East African Campaign
August 3, 1940 C.E. — August 19, 1940 C.E. Italian conquest of British Somaliland
February 5, 1941 C.E. — April 1, 1941 C.E. Battle of Keren
May 4, 1941 C.E. — May 19, 1941 C.E. Battle of Amba Alagi
November 13, 1941 C.E. — November 27, 1941 C.E. Battle of Gondar

Republic of the Sudan
August 18, 1955 C.E. — March 27, 1972 C.E. First Sudanese Civil War
1969 C.E. — 1972 C.E. Anyanya rebellion

Democratic Republic of the Sudan
April 1, 1983 C.E. — January 2005 C.E. Second Sudanese Civil War

Republic of the Sudan
1987 C.E. — ongoing Lord's Resistance Army insurgency
2003 C.E. — ongoing War in Darfur
May 10, 2008 C.E. — May 12, 2,008 C.E. Attack on Omdurman and Khartoum
December 18, 2005 C.E. — January 15, 2010 C.E. Chad-Sudan conflict
November 27, 2006 C.E. — November 29, 2006 C.E. Battle of Malakal
January 2009 C.E. — ongoing Sudanese nomadic conflicts
April 23, 2010 C.E. South Darfur clash
January 7, 2011 C.E. — ongoing South Sudan internal conflict
May 19, 2011 C.E. — ongoing Sudan–SRF conflict
March 26, 2012 C.E. — September 26, 2012 C.E. Sudan–South Sudan Border War
March 26, 2012 C.E. — March 28, 2012 C.E. First Battle of Heglig
April 17, 2012 C.E. — April 18, 2012 C.E. Abyei border clash
December 15, 2013 C.E. - 'February 22, 2020 '''South Sudanese Civil War

References

See also
Sudanese Armed Forces
Sudanese Air Force
The fighting forces of Egypt and Nubia
Sudanic fighting forces versus Persian, Roman and Islamic forces
Military history of Africa
African military systems to 1,800 C.E.
African military systems 1,800 C.E. — 1,900 C.E.
African military systems after 1,900 C.E.

Conflicts